Marcus Both (born 8 June 1979) is an Australian professional golfer.

Both turned professional in 2003. He has played on the Asian Tour since then, winning three times, including the 2003 PRC Sanya Open and the 2009 Johnnie Walker Cambodian Open.

His most recent victory however, came at the 2014 ICTSI Philippine Open with a final round 70 ensuring a two stroke win.

Professional wins (3)

Asian Tour wins (3)

Asian Tour playoff record (0–1)

Team appearances
Amateur
Australian Men's Interstate Teams Matches (representing Victoria): 2000 (winners), 2001, 2002

References

External links

Australian male golfers
Asian Tour golfers
1979 births
Living people